Abdellah Zakour (in Tachelhit: ⵄⴱⴷⵍⵍⴰⵀ ⵣⴰⴳⵓⵔ), also known as "Amghar Gou Ablla" (Ait Abdallah, 1885 - 1972) was a Moroccan Berber military leader who opposed the French conquest of Morocco in the beginning of the 20th century.

Zakour is notable for being the leader of the battle of Ait Abdallah in 1934, which was one the last battles (if not the last) opposing Moroccan resistance fighters to the French army, and marking the end of the so-called "pacification of Morocco". After their surrender following the battle, Zakour was remembered by saying that "no more bullets, no more words" (meaning that there is nothing more to say).

Battle of Ait Aballah
The battle of Ait Abdellah took place in 1934, in the commune with the same name, in Taroudant region, in the Anti-Atlas mountains of Morocco. It opposed resistance fighters led by Abdellah Zakour, to French forces. The battle remained for 3 days where the French army used 18 warplanes and bombs to undermine the locals, who surrendered after that their ammunition was all completed.

Coverage
A book and a film were issued in order to commemorate Abdellah Zakour and the battle of Ait Abdallah:
 In 2021, the High Commissioner for Former Resistants and Former Members of the Liberation Army in Morocco has released a 257-page book entitled "The Battle of Ait Abdallah against the French Colonization.".
 The film "Words of Lead" (2020) by Ahmed Baidu relating the story of the Battle.

See also
 Ali Amhaouch
 Mhand n'Ifrutant
 Mouha ou Hammou Zayani

References 

Sunni Muslims
African resistance to colonialism
Berber Moroccans
Berber rebels
Moroccan Berber politicians
Moroccan dissidents
Moroccan military leaders
Moroccan revolutionaries
Moroccan independence activists
20th-century Moroccan people
1885 births
1972 deaths